James Austin (born 4 June 1940) is an Australian fine-art and architectural photographer.

Biography
James Lucien Ashurst Austin was born in Melbourne, Australia, the eldest son of Lloyd James Austin (1915–1994) and of Jeanne-Françoise (née Guérin). He is the older brother of the late Colin Austin (1941–2010), the scholar of ancient Greek. After studying architecture and fine art at Jesus College, Cambridge, he continued his education at the Courtauld Institute, London.

He then travelled widely in France and Italy as a freelance photographer building up a library of photographs now in use worldwide in art history archives and numerous publications. Among his early clients were the Bollingen Foundation in New York and Sir Nikolaus Pevsner, for whom he provided photographs for twenty volumes of the Buildings of England series. He was Ben Nicholson's personal photographer for the last ten years of the painter's life.

He went back to work at the Courtauld Institute for twelve years, travelling extensively around Europe to photograph historic architecture and sculpture for the Conway Library at the Courtauld. On his retirement he transferred his collection of negatives of architectural and sculptural subjects to the Conway Library whose archive of photographs is in the process of being digitised as part of the Courtauld Connects project.

He returned to freelance work in 1985, when he was commissioned to take all the photographs
for the catalogue of the Robert and Lisa Sainsbury Collection. His career broadened to encompass the photography of fine art. He worked for the National Trust, English Heritage, the Crafts Council, the Tate Gallery, Kettle's Yard in Cambridge and numerous other institutions, architects, artists, craftsmen and collectors. He continued working for the Sainsbury collection – on several exhibition catalogues and photographing new acquisitions – right up to his retirement in April 2004, keeping a studio and darkroom at Wysing Arts Centre from 1997 until then.

The book Antique Woodworking Tools, in which James Austin published more than 1,500 illustrations, clearly demonstrates his skill in photographing small objects in the round. Mark Bridge pinpointed this in his review of the book in Antiques Trade Gazette when he wrote: "[James Austin] has managed to capture the elusive qualities of balance, texture and patina which make the finest tools a pleasure to handle, frequently lifting them into the realm of folk art".

Photographs by Austin are held by many institutions. As well as those listed in the section headed 'External links' below and the Conway Library, the Getty Research Institute purchased 10,000 of his images as a source of reliable research material and Yale University holds the James Austin Photograph Collection of French and Italian Medieval Architecture.

Exhibition
Wingfield Barns Arts Centre, Eye, Suffolk: solo exhibition of specially commissioned photographs, summer 2002

Honours
James Austin was a Fellow of the British Institute of Professional Photography (BIPP) from 1977 to 1991.

Bibliography

Books for which James Austin did all, most or many of the photographs:
 Prior, Katherine, with many photographs by James Austin (2012). In Good Hands: 250 Years of Craftsmanship at Swaine Adeney Brigg.  Cambridge: John Adamson.  
 Russell, David R. with Robert Lesage and photographs by James Austin, cataloguing assisted by Peter Hackett (2010). Antique Woodworking Tools: Their Craftsmanship from the Earliest Times to the Twentieth Century  Cambridge: John Adamson 
 Soros, Susan Weber, and Catherine Arbuthnott (2003). Thomas Jeckyll: Architect and Designer, 1827–1881. New Haven, CT and London: Yale University Press  (Winner of the 2004 Henry Russell Hitchcock Award sponsored by the Victorian Society in America and winner of the 2005 Philip Johnson Award given by the Society of Architectural Historians)
 Frankel, Cyril (2000). Modern Pots: Hans Coper, Lucie Rie and Their Contemporaries: The Lisa Sainsbury Collection. London and New York: Thames and Hudson 
 Gillow, John, and Bryan Sentence (1999). World Textiles. London: Thames and Hudson  Boston, MA: Bullfinch 
 Grimstone, A.V. (1997). Pembroke College, Cambridge: A Celebration. Cambridge: Pembroke College No ISBN
 Hooper, Steven (ed.), with photography by James Austin (1997). Robert and Lisa Sainsbury Collection (3 vols.). New Haven and London: Yale University Press 
Ray, Nicholas (1994). Cambridge Architecture: A Concise Guide. Cambridge: Cambridge University Press Paperback 
Mâle, Émile (1978, 1983, 1986). Studies in Religious Iconography: Religious Art in France (3 vols.) Princeton, NJ: Princeton University Press

Notes

External links
 The photographic collection at the National Gallery of Art, Washington DC, includes 8,000 photographs by James Austin of Greek and French Gothic architecture
 Princeton University, Department of Art and Archaeology: James Austin Collection
James Austin's private work on Flickr
 Antique Woodworking Tools site

1940 births
People educated at Manchester Grammar School
Alumni of Jesus College, Cambridge
Alumni of the Courtauld Institute of Art
Architectural photographers
Australian photographers
Living people